Giuseppe Sanfelice or Francisco Maria Sanfelice (1615–1660) was a Roman Catholic prelate who served as Apostolic Nuncio to Germany (1652–1659) and Archbishop of Cosenza (1650–1660).

Biography
Giuseppe Sanfelice was born in 1615 in Naples, Italy and ordained a priest on 25 May 1649.
On 22 Aug 1650, he was appointed during the papacy of Pope Innocent X as Archbishop of Cosenza.
On 16 Oct 1650, he was consecrated bishop by Pier Luigi Carafa (seniore), Cardinal-Priest of Santi Silvestro e Martino ai Monti, with Ranuccio Scotti Douglas, Bishop Emeritus of Borgo San Donnino, and Pietro Vidoni (seniore), Bishop of Lodi, serving as co-consecrators. 
On 13 Apr 1652, he was appointed during the papacy of Pope Innocent X as Apostolic Nuncio to Germany where he served until Sep 1659.
He served as Archbishop of Cosenza until his death on 20 Nov 1660.

While bishop, he was the principal co-consecrator of Francesco Zeno, Bishop of Capodistria (1660); and Guido Bentivoglio, Bishop of Bertinoro (1660).

References

External links and additional sources
 (for Chronology of Bishops) 
 (for Chronology of Bishops) 
 
 

17th-century Italian Roman Catholic archbishops
Bishops appointed by Pope Innocent X
Clergy from Naples
1615 births
1660 deaths
Apostolic Nuncios to Germany